Veerle Wouters (born 2 June 1974 in Hasselt) is a Belgian politician and is affiliated to the N-VA. She was elected as a member of the Belgian Chamber of Representatives in 2010.

Notes

Living people
Members of the Chamber of Representatives (Belgium)
New Flemish Alliance politicians
1974 births
People from Hasselt
21st-century Belgian politicians
21st-century Belgian women politicians